The 2010 Rai Open was a professional tennis tournament played on outdoor red clay courts. It was part of the 2010 ATP Challenger Tour. It took place in Rome, Italy between 12 and 18 April 2009.

ATP entrants

Seeds

 Rankings are as of April 5, 2010.

Other entrants
The following players received wildcards into the singles main draw:
  Flavio Cipolla
  Antonio Comporto
  Gianluca Naso
  Matteo Trevisan

The following players received entry from the qualifying draw:
  Jesse Huta Galung
  Boris Pašanski
  Franko Škugor
  Matteo Viola

Champions

Singles

 Filippo Volandri def.  Lamine Ouahab, 6–4, 7-5

Doubles

 Tomasz Bednarek /  Mateusz Kowalczyk def.  Jeff Coetzee /  Jesse Witten, 6–4, 7–6(4)

References

Italian Tennis Federation official website
ITF search 

Rai Open
Rai Open